Aruküla railway station is a railway station serving the small borough of Aruküla in Harju County in northern Estonia. It is the seventh station on Elron's eastern route between Tallinn and Aegviidu. It is located about 21 km south-east of Balti jaam. The station is served by commuter trains heading to Aegviidu and consists of two 150 metre platforms.

See also
 List of railway stations in Estonia
 Rail transport in Estonia

References

External links

 Official website of Eesti Raudtee (EVR) – the national railway infrastructure company of Estonia  responsible for most of the Estonian railway network
 Official website of Elron – the national passenger train operating company in Estonia operating all domestic passenger train services

Railway stations in Estonia
Raasiku Parish